Betty H. Fairfax is a high school in the Phoenix Union High School District, Laveen, Arizona, United States. The campus is located at 8225 South 59th Ave.

Fairfax's enrollment is about 1,678 students. It predominantly serves students from partner elementary districts Laveen and Roosevelt.

The high school was designed by DLR Group and features a small learning community curriculum model.

The school's namesake, longtime (57-year) Phoenix Union educator Betty Harriet Fairfax, died in November 2010 at the age of 92.  It was the first school in the district to be named after an employee.

References

External links
 Betty Fairfax High School
 Phoenix Union High School District website
 Arizona Department of Education School Report Card

Public high schools in Arizona
High schools in Phoenix, Arizona
Educational institutions established in 2007
2007 establishments in Arizona
International Baccalaureate schools in Arizona